The Valley of Decision is a 1945 film directed by Tay Garnett, adapted by Sonya Levien and John Meehan from Marcia Davenport's 1942 novel of the same name. Set in Pittsburgh, Pennsylvania, in the 1870s, it stars Greer Garson and Gregory Peck. The film was nominated for two Academy Awards for Best Actress in a Leading Role (Greer Garson) and Best Music, Scoring of a Dramatic or Comedy Picture. This was Garson's sixth nomination and her fifth consecutive, a record for most consecutive Best Actress nominations that still stands (tied with Bette Davis).

The Valley of Decision tells the story of a young Irish house maid, Mary Rafferty, who falls in love with Paul Scott, the son of her employer, a Pittsburgh steel mill owner. Their romance is endangered when Mary's family and friends, all steel mill workers, go on strike against Paul's father as the local steel industry is bought out by bigger concerns. When the Scott family refuses to sell their mill, Paul, the only son who cares about the mill and the workers, tries to intervene amid rumors the union is calling for violence under threat of strikebreakers. The Scott family, Mary and her father, and the union leader try to reach an agreement despite opposition from Paul’s brother.

The Allegheny City railroad station is misspelled as Alleghany City.

Cast

Reception
Bosley Crowther wrote, "the early phases of the picture are rather studiously on the "cute" side" and "the middle phases are also somewhat artificially contrived...but the final phase...does have authority and depth;"

TV Guide said it is "huge (and) sprawling... the realism of the sets is a tribute to the art directors and set decorators...three out of five stars." The film was a massive hit, earning $4,566,000 in the U.S. and Canada and $3,530,000 elsewhere resulting in a profit of $3,480,000.

References

External links
 
 
 
 

1945 films
American black-and-white films
1940s English-language films
Films based on American novels
Films directed by Tay Garnett
Films scored by Herbert Stothart
Films set in the 1870s
Films set in Pittsburgh
Metro-Goldwyn-Mayer films
Films with screenplays by Sonya Levien
1940s historical films
American historical films
Photoplay Awards film of the year winners
1940s American films